The Hanging Valley is the fourth novel by Canadian detective fiction writer Peter Robinson in the Inspector Banks series. It was published in 1989, and reprinted a number of times since.

External links
Dedicated page on author's website

1989 Canadian novels
Novels by Peter Robinson (novelist)
Novels set in Yorkshire
Viking Press books